Dagua is a town and  municipality located in the Department of Valle del Cauca, Colombia.

History

Dagua was founded in 1909.

Corregimientos 

1. Santa María

2. El Salado

3. El Chilcal

4. Providencia

5. El Danubio 

6. La Cascada

7. La Elsa

8. El Queremal

9. El Limonar

10. Los Alpes

11. La Providencia

12. Atuncela

13. Loboguerrero

14. El Naranjo

15. Juntas

16. Zabaletas

17. El Piñal

18. Zelandia 

19. El Rucio

20. Pepitas

21. Villahermosa

22. El Palmar

23. Borrero Ayerbe

24. El Carmen

25. San Bernardo

26. Jiguales

27. Kilómetro 18

29. San Vicente

30. Cisneros.

31. La Clorinda

Municipalities of Valle del Cauca Department
Populated places established in 1909
1909 establishments in Colombia